David Myers (May 8, 1914, Auburn, New York–August 26, 2004, Mill Valley, California, USA) was an American photographer and cinematographer noted for his documentaries on popular music and musicians.

Photographer
Myers was born on May 8, 1914, in Auburn, New York. When he was 15, the New York Times paid him $15 for a shot of a fire in Greenwich, and after being further inspired by photographer Walker Evans' work at the New York Museum of Modern Art in 1938, David also worked for the Farm Security Administration while studying at Antioch College. His FSA pictures were included in Just Before the War, exhibition in the Prints and Photographs Division of the Library of Congress  shown on the Gallery of the Main Library February 14–March 30, 1969.

During World War II, a conscientious objector, Myers was conscripted to  the U.S. Forest Service and photographed patients of a mental hospital in Spokane, Washington. After the war he attended the California School of Fine Arts which was then staffed by Ansel Adams, Minor White, Imogen Cunningham, Dorothea Lange, Lisette Model, and Edward Weston. His gritty portrait of a heavily laden and exhausted farm boy featured in Edward Steichen’s 1955 exhibition The Family of Man for the Museum of Modern Art that was seen by 9 million visitors worldwide.

Cinematographer and director
In 1957 he directed a documentary film Ansel Adams, Photographer, written by Nancy Newhall and narrated by Beaumont Newhall. He then directed the documentary short Ask Me, Don't Tell Me (1961) with the support of photographer Imogen Cunningham, and continued his career shooting documentaries for both National Geographic and the United Nations through the 1960s, requiring much international travel. His first major credit was co-photography with Didier Tarot on Agnes Varda's short Oncle Yanco ( 'Uncle Yanco', 1967), made in San Francisco about one of her relatives who was a painter leading a hippie life on a barge.

At fifty-six, his contribution as one of five camera operators on the landmark rock concert documentary Woodstock (1970) brought an Oscar and established his reputation as a filmmaker in the rock music industry. That achievement was followed by his cinematography on Johnny Cash in San Quentin (1969), Elvis on Tour (1972), Joe Cocker: Mad Dogs & Englishmen (1971), Soul to Soul (1971), Wattstax (1973), Let the Good Times Roll (1973), Save the Children (1973), The Grateful Dead (1977), Martin Scorsese's The Last Waltz (1978), Neil Young's Neil Young & Crazy Horse: Rust Never Sleeps (1979) and Joni Mitchell's Shadows and Light (1980).

Myers also shot the Oscar-winning documentary Marjoe (1972) and The Mysterious Monsters (1975) on paranormal phenomena. in addition to documentary work, Myers was the cinematographer on feature films including George Lucas' early THX 1138 (1971), Welcome to L.A. (1976), Bob Dylan's Renaldo and Clara (1978), FM (1978), Roadie (1980), Zoot Suit (1981) and UFOria (1985).

Legacy and death
Myers was made an honorary member of the Society of Operating Cameramen before he died at age 90 following a stroke on August 26, 2004.

References

American cinematographers
American documentary filmmakers
1914 births
2004 deaths
Rock music people
People from Auburn, New York